City College station may refer to:

 City College station (Sacramento), a light rail station in Sacramento, California
 City College station (San Diego), a light rail station in San Diego, California
 Ocean Avenue/CCSF Pedestrian Bridge station, a light rail station serving City College of San Francisco, California
 137th Street–City College station, subway station in New York